Coyote Oldman is a duo of new-age musicians consisting of Native American flute players Barry Stramp and Michael Graham Allen. The name Coyote Oldman is derived from the trickster archetype in Native American mythology.

Michael Graham Allen met Barry Stramp in 1981 at an Oklahoma City crafts fair. Their music can be described as new-age electronica. The duo plays Japanese and Indian flutes, Incan pan-pipes, ocarinas and Native American pipes, as well as contemporary instruments such as guitars and keyboards.

Oklahoma-born Barry Stramp (b. 1959) is a classically trained concert flautist, while Alabama-born Michael Graham Allen (b. 1950) is a manufacturer of handmade flutes in addition to being a musician. Since 1987, the duo has released 13 albums.

Discography 
 1986 - Night Forest 
 1987 - Tear of the Moon
 1988 - Landscape 
 1990 - Thunder Chord, Hearts of Space Records)
 1992 - In Medicine River 
 1993 - Compassion 
 1995 - The Shape of Time
 1997 - In Beauty I Walk—The Best of Coyote Oldman (Greatest Hits) (Hearts of Space Records)
 1998 - Floating on Evening
 1999 - House Made of Dawn (Hearts of Space Records)
 2004 - Rainbird 
 2008 - Under an Ancient Sky (Hearts of Space Records)
 2011 - Time Travelers

External links 
 [ All Music Web Site]
 Coyote Oldman Web Site

References

New-age music groups
Musical groups from Oklahoma
American ambient music groups